Indira Gandhi Institute of Technology (IGIT), Sarang was established in the year of 1982 and was managed directly by the Govt. of Odisha in the name of Odisha College of Engineering (OCE). Prior to this, since 1981, the institute in the name of Modern Polytechnic (MPT) was offering Diploma Courses in Civil, Electrical, Mechanical, Mining Survey Engineering. In the year 1987, both OCE & MPT were merged and renamed as IGIT, Sarang and the management was transferred to an Autonomous Society. Presently, the Institute is offering nine Under Graduate Engineering courses in Civil, Chemical, Electrical, Mechanical, Metallurgical, Electronics & Telecommunication, Computer Science Engg., Production Engg., Architecture; & two part-time Post Graduate Engg courses in Industrial Power Control & Drives, Environmental Sc. &Engg.; nine full time Post Graduate Engg courses / Master course Computer Sc.Engg., Electronics and Telecom. Engg, Geotech.Engg.,Mechanical System Design, Mett. & Materials Engg., Power Electronics & Drives, Power System Engg., Production Engg., Structural Engg., Master in Computer Application; besides five Diploma Courses in Civil, Electrical, Electronics & Telecommunication, Mechanical & Metallurgical Engineering.Currently, Dr. Satyabrata Mohanta is the director of the institute.

Five branches in undergraduate courses of the institute are accredited by the NBA in the year 2016. It is affiliated to Biju Patnaik University of Technology and the State Council for Technical Education & Vocational Training. In 2014 the Government of Odisha has decided to confer unitary university status to IGIT. In 2017 the University Grants Commission granted autonomous status to the institution.

History
IGIT was established in 1982 and was managed directly by the government of Odisha in the name of Odisha College of Engineering (OCE). Prior to this, since 1981, the institute under the name Modern Polytechnic (MPT) offered Diploma Courses in civil, electrical, mechanical, and mining survey engineering. In  1987, OCE and MPT were merged and renamed as IGIT, Sarang, and the management was transferred to an Autonomous Society. This is the first Govt. Engg. College in Odisha to have accreditation from NBA (AICTE).

Campus

The institute is residential with an integrated campus covering 179 acres of land encompassing hostels, staff quarters and the Dr. M. P. Mishra Memorial Stadium, with basketball, volleyball and badminton courts. The institute has facilities like the Central Library (with 27,000 volumes of books), Central Computer Centre, Central Workshop, Knowledge Centre, eight student hostels with accommodation for over 1300 students whereas present intake is 1200 per year (only B.Tech not including M.Tech, M.Sc, Diploma). Other amenities include SBI (Core Bank facilities), guesthouse, on-campus dispensary, post office, canteen, gymnasium, and a students and employees co-operative. The serene atmosphere available at Sarang offers the students optimum opportunity to concentrate on studies.

Courses
The institution offers undergraduate and post-graduate programs in engineering and natural sciences. The following academic programmes are available at IGIT :
Bachelor of Architecture (B.Arch)
Bachelor of Technology (B.Tech)
Master of Technology (M.Tech)
Diploma in Engineering
Master of Computer Applications (MCA)
Master of Science (M.Sc)
Doctor of Philosophy (Ph.D.)

Undergraduate courses
The institute offers 4-year undergraduate degree program in the following  disciplines :
 Chemical Engineering (accredited by NBA)                                            
 Civil Engineering (accredited by NBA)                                                    
 Computer Science & Engineering                                                       
 Electrical Engineering (accredited by NBA)      
 Electronics & Telecommunication Engineering
 Metallurgy and Material Engineering (accredited by NBA)
 Mechanical Engineering (accredited by NBA)
 Production Engineering
 Architecture

IGIT also offers 3-year B.Tech degree for diploma holders under lateral entry scheme with the approval of AICTE New Delhi, recognised by the government of Odisha and affiliated under Biju Patnaik University of Technology, Rourkela.

Postgraduate courses
The institute offers two part-time and nine full-time Postgraduate degree program in the following engineering disciplines :
Environmental science (part-time for 2.5 years)
Production engineering (part-time for 2 years)
Electronics and Telecommunication Engineering
 Geotechnical Engineering
 Power Electronics and Drives Engineering
Power Systems Engineering
Production Engineering
Metallurgy and Materials Science Engineering
Industrial Metallurgy
Mechanical System Design Engineering
Structural engineering
Master in Computer Application (MCA)
In addition to the above courses, IGIT, Sarang has also been recognised as the centre of excellence in the field of engineering research by Utkal University, Vani Vihar, Bhubaneswar, Odisha.

Diploma Engineering courses
The institute offers a 3-year Diploma in the following engineering disciplines :
Civil Engineering
Electrical Engineering
Electronics & Telecommunication Engineering
Metallurgy and Material Engineering Engineering

Central Library

The library has a collection of 27,000 text & reference books, handbooks, and IS codes. About 50 journals are subscribed to.  The library's transaction service is fully automated.

Student halls of residence
The institute is fully residential and provides hostel accommodation for all students. The institute has seven residential halls :
 Akash Bhawan - All first-year boys (B.Tech)
 Aryabhatta Bhawan - All second-year boys (B.Tech)
 Bhaskar Bhawan - Third-year boys (B.Tech/B.Arch)
 Brahmos Bhawan - Third year, final year and fifth year boys (B.Tech/B.Arch)
 Surya Bhawan - All final year boys (B.Tech)
 Agni Bhawan - All Diploma boys
 Rohini Bhawan - All girl students of B.Tech/B.Arch first and second year, M.Tech, MCA & Diploma
 Prithvi Bhawan - All third-year and final-year girls (B.Tech/B.Arch).

College festivals
 Horizon: Horizon is the institute's annual techno-cultural fest.
 
 Technovation: Techno-Cultural fest of the Department of CSE&A, IGIT, Sarang held under the aegis of Mycomp Society, IGIT.
 Admantium: National level technical symposium held by Department of Metallurgical and Materials Engineering every year since 2014.

Student organisations 
 Society for Physical Education & Recreation (SPER)
 Social Service Guild (SSG)
 IGIT Cultural Association
 Mycomp Society
 Society Of Literary Enthusiasts (SOLE)
 Audio Visual Club
 IGIT Robotics Society
 National cadet corps (NCC)

References

External links
IGIT Sarang
IGIT Sarang Alumni Association

State Council for Technical Education & Vocational Training
All India Council for Technical Education
Engineering colleges in Odisha
Colleges affiliated with Biju Patnaik University of Technology
Angul district
Monuments and memorials to Indira Gandhi
Educational institutions established in 1982
1982 establishments in Orissa